A noble polyhedron is one which is isohedral (all faces the same) and isogonal (all vertices the same). They were first studied in any depth by Edmund Hess and Max Brückner in the late 19th century, and later by Branko Grünbaum.

Classes of noble polyhedra

Those sustaining two transitive properties simultaneously, either isogonal, isohedral or, isotoxal. The presence of regular polygons in the periphery ensues the three at the same time as exemplified in Platonic order. The presence of non-perfectly regular polygons expedites two of them. Thus, there are several main classes of noble polyhedra:

 Regular polyhedra.
 Disphenoid tetrahedra.
 Crown polyhedra or Stephanoids. An infinite series of toroids.
 A variety of miscellaneous examples, e.g. the stellated icosahedra D and H, or their duals. It is not known whether there are finitely many, and if so how many might remain to be discovered.

If we allow some of Grünbaum's stranger constructions as polyhedra, then we have two more infinite series of toroids:
 Wreath polyhedra. These have triangular faces in coplanar pairs which share an edge.
 V-faced polyhedra. These have vertices in coincident pairs and degenerate faces.

In 2008, Robert Webb discovered a new noble polyhedron, a faceting of the snub cube. This was the first new class of noble polyhedra (with chiral octahedral symmetry) to be discovered since Brückner's work, over a century before. 

In 2020, Ulrich Mikloweit generated 52 noble polyhedra by extending isohedral facetings of uniform polyhedra, of which 24 were already described by Brückner and 19 were entirely new.

Duality of noble polyhedra

We can distinguish between dual structural forms (topologies) on the one hand, and dual geometrical arrangements when reciprocated about a concentric sphere, on the other. Where the distinction is not made below, the term 'dual' covers both kinds.

The dual of a noble polyhedron is also noble. Many are also self-dual:
 The five regular polyhedra form dual pairs, with the tetrahedron being self-dual.
 The disphenoid tetrahedra are all topologically identical. Geometrically they come in dual pairs – one elongated, and one correspondingly squashed.
 A crown polyhedron is topologically self-dual. It does not seem to be known whether any geometrically self-dual examples exist.
 The wreath and V-faced polyhedra are dual to each other.

References

Grünbaum, B.; Polyhedra with hollow faces, Proc. NATO-ASI Conf. on polytopes: abstract, convex and computational, Toronto 1983, Ed. Bisztriczky, T. Et Al., Kluwer Academic (1994), pp. 43–70.
Grünbaum, B.;  Are your polyhedra the same as my polyhedra? Discrete and Computational Geometry: The Goodman-Pollack Festschrift.  B. Aronov,  S. Basu,  J. Pach,  and  Sharir, M., eds.  Springer,  New York 2003, pp. 461–488.

External links
List of noble polyhedra at Polytope Wiki

Polyhedra